Kim Mun-sik (Kim Moon-shik, born 1 December 1928) was a South Korean equestrian. He competed in two events at the 1964 Summer Olympics.

References

External links
 

1928 births
Possibly living people
South Korean male equestrians
Olympic equestrians of South Korea
Equestrians at the 1964 Summer Olympics
Place of birth missing (living people)